Bagrat (8 May 1776 – 8 May 1841) was a Georgian royal prince (batonishvili) of the House of Bagrationi and an author. A son of King George XII of Georgia, Bagrat occupied important administrative posts in the last years of the Georgian monarchy, after whose abolition by the Russian Empire in 1801 he entered the imperial civil service. He was known in Russia as the tsarevich Bagrat Georgievich Gruzinsky. He is the author of works in the history of Georgia, veterinary medicine and economics.

Life in Georgia
Bagrat was born in Tbilisi into the family of Crown Prince George, the future king George XII, and his first wife Ketevan née Andronikashvili. In 1790, Bagrat, then aged 14, received a princely domain in the Ksani valley after his reigning grandfather, Erekle II, dispossessed the defiant Kvenipneveli dynasty of the duchy of Ksani, dividing it into three parts. Other parts of the duchy were granted to Bagrat's elder brother Ioann and uncle Iulon. In addition, during the reign of his father George XII (1798–1801), Bagrat received Kakheti in possession. Around the same time, he became involved in a dynastic feud among the numerous posterity of Erekle II and George XII. In November 1800, Bagrat was one of the commanders of a combined Russo-Georgian force that defeated the joint invasion by the Avar khan Umma and Bagrat's own paternal half-uncle Alexander on the banks of the Iori in Kakheti.

Life in Russia
After George XII's death in 1800, the arrival of the Russian rule brought the Bagrationi rule to an end. The members of the Georgian royal family were deprived of their estates and deported to Russia proper. Unlike many of his royal relatives, Bagrat did not take arms against the Russian regime and, in 1803, accepted his exile in Moscow, which he left the day before the city's occupation by the French troops in 1812, and then in St. Petersburg, where he would live until his death. He was made a chamberlain of the Russian tsar Alexander I in 1818 and became a Privy Councillor and Senator of the empire in 1828.

During his life in Russia, Bagrat composed a continuation of the Georgian history written by his brother David, covering the period from the middle of the 18th century to the 1840s. He also compiled a list of Georgians fighting in the Russian ranks against Napoleonic France in 1812. He also authored memoirs and the first Georgian-language book in veterinary medicine, published in St. Petersburg in 1818.

Family

Prince Bagrat was married to Princess Ekaterine [Ketevan] Cholokashvili (1781 – 30 June 1831), a daughter of Prince Durmishkhan Cholokashvili, sometime bailiff (mouravi) of Pshavi and Khevsureti. She died of cholera in St. Petersburg and was buried at the Smolensky Cemetery. Bagrat and Ekaterina were the parents of ten children, of whom only three reached adulthood:    
Prince Spiridon (1800 – died in infancy).  
Princess Barbare (Varvara Bagratovna Gruzinskaya) (1804–1870), married Lieutenant-General Prince Dimitri Orbeliani.
Princess Daria (Daria Bagratovna Gruzinskaya) (1808–1809).
Prince Petre (Pyotr Bagratovich Gruzinsky) (1811–1812).
Prince Giorgi (Georgy Bagratovich Gruzinsky) (1812–c. 1816).
Princess Elisabed (Elizaveta Bagratovna Gruzinskaya) (1813–1815).
Prince Nikoloz (Nikolay Bagratovich Gruzinsky) (1816–1833).
Prince Konstantine (Konstantin Bagratovich Gruzinsky) (born 1817).
Prince David (David Bagratovich Gruzinsky) (30 April 1819 – 24 September 1888), an unofficial head of the Georgian royal house (1880–1888). He was married to Anna Alekseyevna Mazurina (11 January 1824 – 10 August 1866), with one son, Spiridon (born 1861).
Prince Alexander (Alexander Bagratovich Gruzinsky) (1820–1865).

Ancestry

References

Bibliography

Bagrationi dynasty of the Kingdom of Kartli-Kakheti
1776 births
1841 deaths
Georgian princes
19th-century historians from Georgia (country)
Generals from Georgia (country)
Politicians from Georgia (country)
Senators of the Russian Empire
Writers from Tbilisi
Male writers from Georgia (country)